The 2018–19 Ukrainian Basketball SuperLeague was the 2018–19 edition of the Ukrainian top-tier basketball championship. Cherkaski Mavpy were the defending champions.

Khimik won its third domestic title, its first one since 2016, after beating Kyiv-Basket in the finals. Khimik's Deon Edwin was named the USL Most Valuable Player this season.

Teams

Eight teams joined the competition. Budivelnyk and BIPA Odessa were replaced by Kyiv-Basket and Odesa respectively.

On 21 June 2018, the Ukrainian federation announced that Budivelnyk would not participate because of its open debts to its players.

Regular season

Standings

Results

Playoffs
Quarterfinals will be played in a best-of-three games format, while semifinals and final in a best-of-five (2–2–1) format.

Bracket

Quarter-finals

|}

Semi-finals

|}

Third place series

|}

Finals

|}

Ukrainian clubs in European competitions

References

External links
Official Ukrainian Basketball Federation website

Ukrainian Basketball SuperLeague seasons
1
Ukraine